Maylor Alberto Núñez Flores (born 5 July 1996) is a Honduran professional footballer who plays as a right-back for Liga Nacional de Honduras club Olimpia.

Career 
Nuñez made his professional debut with Motagua in a 1–0 Liga Nacional loss to C.D. Real Sociedad on 2 May 2015. On 18 November 2018, he signed a professional contract with Olimpia.

International career
Nuñez made his senior debut with the Honduras national team in a friendly 1–1 tie with Belarus on 24 March 2021.

References

External links
 

1996 births
Living people
People from La Ceiba
Honduran footballers
Honduras international footballers
Honduras youth international footballers
Association football fullbacks
F.C. Motagua players
Platense F.C. players
C.D. Olimpia players
Liga Nacional de Fútbol Profesional de Honduras players